Clark C. Wemple (July 19, 1927 – February 1, 1993) was an American politician who served in the New York State Assembly from 1966 to 1982.

References

1927 births
1993 deaths
Republican Party members of the New York State Assembly
20th-century American politicians